Poblicia is a genus of planthoppers in the family Fulgoridae occurring in North and Central America.

Species
 Poblicia fuliginosa (Olivier, 1791)
 Poblicia misella (Stål, 1863)
 Poblicia texana Oman, 1936

References 

Auchenorrhyncha genera
Poiocerinae